El Hijo de L.A. Park (born November 20, 1988) is a Mexican Luchador enmascarado, or masked professional wrestler. His ring name ("The Son of L.A. Park") indicates he is the son of Adolfo Tapia, the original La Parka, who currently wrestles as L.A. Park. He currently wrestles in Mexico for Consejo Mundial de Lucha Libre (CMLL) and alongside his father in the American promotion Major League Wrestling, where he is one half of the World Tag Team Champions with L.A. Park. Originally he wrestled under the name "Black Spirit", keeping the family relation to L.A. Park secret. He has been using the El Hijo de L.A. Park name since 2011. His real name is not a matter of public record, as is often the case with masked wrestlers in Mexico, where their private lives are kept a secret from the wrestling fans.

Professional wrestling career

Debut 
The son of L.A. Park  was trained for his professional wrestling career by his father but primarily
by Pierko El Boricua, Skayde and Tony Salazar. His father decided that it would be best for his son to receive most of his training from someone else as he wanted his son to learn the same way he originally had. He made his professional wrestling debut on July 9, 2008.

He began wrestling under the ring name "Black Spirit" and wore a mask and outfit that was greatly inspired by his father's iconic skeleton suit. Both L.A. Park and Black Spirit denied they were related, using a storyline that Black Spirit was a big fan of L.A. Park and had been given permission to use a variation of the mask. At other points it was claimed that Black Spirit was L.A. Park's "star pupil" to explain the almost identical masks without admitting to the family relationship. Initially Black Spirit worked for various local wrestling promotions in Mexico, gaining valuable experience as he worked with or against other Skayde students such as Black Thunder, Turbo, Skayde, Jr. and Skayde himself. He developed a long running feud with Black Thunder, a feud Black Spirit himself hoped would lead to his first ever Lucha de Apuesta, bet match. Black Spirit challenged Skayde for his NWA Mexico Welterweight Championship in a Torneo cibernetico style match, but lost to Turbo. Black Spirit was initially described as "nervous but with promise" after one of his early matches. In interviews he stated that he preferred the high flying style but could also mat wrestle if need be. Through his father's connections Black Spirit often worked on the same shows as his father, including the debut show for the Perros del Mal Producciones where his father was headlining the show. Black Spirit teamed with Turbo and Super Nova to defeat Black Thunder, Cerebro Negro and X-Fly in the third match of the night. Afterwards it was commented that Black Spirit was impressive in his first showing for Los Perros del Mal. He also appeared in the semi-main event at a tribute show held for Pierroth, Jr., teaming with Guerrero Maya, Jr. and Canelo Casas against El Hijo de Cien Caras, Cien Caras, Jr. and Máscara Año 2000, Jr. The show also featured L.A. Park in the main event. Throughout 2009 Black Spirit kept appearing on Perros del Mal shows that also featured LA Park, leading to further speculation that the two were indeed related. By early 2010 it was a very poorly kept secret that Black Spirit was the son of LA Park.

El Hijo del L.A. Park

After working as Black Spirit for close to a year and a half, it was finally publicly acknowledge that he was indeed the son of L.A. Park, changing his ring name to "El Hijo de L.A. Park". The revelation came after Black Spirit helped his father in a match against Blue Demon, Jr. on January 29, 2010. L.A. Park subsequently announced the official name change. El Hijo de L.A. Park declared that his goal was to "round up all the juniors" including Dr. Wagner, Jr. and Perro Aguayo, Jr. Subsequently, a feud between El Hijo de L.A. Park and El Hijo de Dr. Wagner (Son of Dr. Wagner, Jr.) has been talked about, continuing a feud between their famous fathers. His first match as El Hijo de L.A. Park took place om March 14, 2010 in the main event of a Los Perros del Mal show, where he teamed with El Oriental, Groon XXX and Lizmark, Jr. against Aguayo, Jr., Mr. Águila, Halloween and Damián 666. El Hijo de L.A. Park lost the match when Aguayo pulled the mask off him and pinned El Hijo de L.A. Park while he was trying to cover up his face. On June 6, 2010, at AAA's Triplemanía XVIII, El Hijo de L.A. Park made an appearance beside his father, when Los Perros del Mal started an invasion storyline with AAA. He has not appeared for the company since. On July 12, 2010 Hijo de L.A. Park teamed up with Dr. Wagner III and Scorpio, Jr. to take on Consejo Mundial de Lucha Libre (CMLL) wrestlers La Máscara, Máscara Dorada and Valiente at the Promociones Gutiérrez 1st Anniversary Show. The team lost by disqualification, when Scorpio, Jr. unmasked La Máscara. On December 26, 2010, El Hijo de L.A. Park won his first Lucha de Apuesta, winning La Imagen's mask in a three-way match, which also included El Enfermero. On June 18, 2011, El Hijo de L.A. Park made an appearance at Triplemanía XIX, accompanying his father to his Mask vs. Hair match against El Mesías. In October 2011, El Hijo de L.A. Park was invited for a tryout with WWE, during the promotion's tour of Mexico.

Championships and accomplishments 
Generacion XXI
G21 Tag Team Championship (1 time, current) – with L.A. Park
Kaoz Lucha Libre
Kaoz Trios Championship (1 time)  with La Bestia del Ring and L.A. Park Jr.
Lucha Libre V.I.P
Lucha Libre V.I.P Junior Championship (1 time)
Major League Wrestling
MLW World Tag Team Championship (1 time) – with L.A. Park
Organización Independiente de Lucha Libre
OILL Juniors Tag Team Tournament (2010) – with El Hijo de Dr. Wagner Jr.
 Pro Wrestling Illustrated
 Ranked No. 149 of the top 500 singles wrestlers in the PWI 500 in 2020
Universal Wrestling Entertainment
UWE Tag Team Championship (1 time) – with El Hijo del Pirata Morgan

Luchas de Apuesta record

Notes

References 

Mexican male professional wrestlers
Masked wrestlers
1988 births
Living people
Sportspeople from Monclova
Professional wrestlers from Coahuila
21st-century professional wrestlers
MLW World Tag Team Champions